A scheme is a systematic plan for the implementation of a certain idea.

Scheme or schemer may refer to:

Arts and entertainment
 The Scheme (TV series), a BBC Scotland documentary series
 The Scheme (band), an English pop band
 The Scheme, an action role-playing video game for the PC-8801, made by Quest Corporation
 Schemer (comics), Richard Fisk, a Marvel Comics villain turned antihero
 Horace Schemer, a fictional character in the TV series Shining Time Station
 Schemee, a fictional child character and Schemer's nephew in the TV Series Shining Time Station
 Schemers (film), a Scottish film

Other uses
 Classification scheme, eg a thesaurus, a taxonomy, a data model, or an ontology
 Scheme (programming language), a minimalist dialect of Lisp
 Scheme (mathematics), a concept in algebraic geometry
 Scheme (linguistics), a figure of speech that changes a sentence's structure
 Scam, an attempt to swindle or cheat people through deception
Get-rich-quick scheme, a plan to obtain high rates of return for a small investment
 Matrix scheme, or ladder scheme, a business model involving the exchange of money for a certain product with a side bonus of being added to a waiting list for a product of greater value than the amount given
 Ponzi scheme, a scam paying investors returns from their own or others' money (rather than from profits)
 Pyramid scheme, a non-sustainable business model involving payments primarily for enrolling other people
 Google Schemer, a former service allowing its users to share plans and interests
 Scheme, a type of government program in India

See also
 Color scheme
 Contract
 Housing scheme, a Scottish term for a council housing development
 Investment fund
 Numbering scheme
 Rhyme scheme
 Schema (disambiguation)
 URI scheme, the outermost part of internet Uniform Resource Identifiers